Believe in Me may refer to:

Film 
 Believe in Me (1971 film), an American romantic drama produced by Robert Chartoff and Irwin Winkler
 Believe in Me (2006 film), an American drama directed by Robert Collector

Music

Albums 
 Believe in Me (Duff McKagan album), 1993
 Believe in Me (Regina Belle album), 1998
 Believe in Me (EP), an EP by Jeff Scott Soto

Songs 
 "Believe in Me" (J. Geils Band song), from the group's 1975 album "Hotline", also the Rockpalast intro
 "Believe in Me" (ATB song), 2005
 "Believe in Me" (Bonnie Tyler song), 2013
 "Believe in Me" (Dan Fogelberg song), 1984
 "Believe in Me" (Lenny Kravitz song), 2002
 "Believe in Me" (The Pierces song), 2014
 "Believe in Me" (Sloan song), 2008
 "Believe in Me" (Michelle Williams song), 2015
 "Believe in Me", a song by Boyzone from Said and Done
 "Believe in Me", a song by Demi Lovato from Don't Forget
 "Believe in Me", a song by David Rolfe, the opening theme for the fifth season of Pokémon
 "Believe in Me", a song by R. Kelly from Write Me Back
 "Believe in Me", a song by Rick Springfield from Comic Book Heroes